Navi Peth is a general term, in the Marathi language, for a locality in the Indian cities. These include cities like Pune, Solapur, Madhavnagar, Karad, Ahmednagar etc. The term Navi has derived from the word "new" in Marathi. It means that this peth is been situated or developed quite recently than other peths.

Geography of Maharashtra